Halloween Music Collection is a best of album by the gothic, horror instrumental band, Midnight Syndicate, released on July 30, 2010. Featuring a selection of tracks made popular through the music's exposure in the Halloween, haunted attraction, horror music, and role-playing game industries.

Album information and release 
Halloween Music Collection was released to celebrate the band's 13th Anniversary and contained music from Midnight Syndicate albums released to that point (2010). It was released and distributed by Midnight Syndicate's label and distributor, Entity Productions, one of the largest distributors of Halloween music CDs at the time. The album was included with The Dead Matter (2010) DVD and The Dead Matter: Original Motion Picture Soundtrack in The Dead Matter: 3-Disc Deluxe Edition released on July 30, 2010 and sold through Hot Topic store in the US.

Track listing

Personnel 
Edward Douglas – composer
Gavin Goszka – composer

Production 
Producers – Edward Douglas, Gavin Goszka
Mastering - Gavin Goszka
Photography - Rex B. Hamilton, Mike "Pogo" Hach, Sarah Mann
Cover art and Design - Brainstorm Studios

References

2010 albums
Midnight Syndicate compilation albums